2nd SFFCC Awards
December 15, 2003

Best Picture: 
 Lost in Translation 
The 2nd San Francisco Film Critics Circle Awards, honoring the best in film for 2003, were given on 15 December 2003.

Winners

Best Picture:
Lost in Translation
Best Director: 
Peter Jackson - The Lord of the Rings: The Return of the King
Best Actor: 
Bill Murray - Lost in Translation
Best Actress:
Charlize Theron - Monster
Best Supporting Actor: 
Peter Sarsgaard - Shattered Glass
Best Supporting Actress: 
Patricia Clarkson - Pieces of April
Best Foreign Language Film: 
The Son (Le fils) • Belgium/France
Best Documentary:
Capturing the Friedmans
Marlon Riggs Award (for courage & vision in Bay Area filmmaking): 
Sam Green - The Weather Underground
Special Citation:
Russian Ark (better late than never to honor a brilliant, innovative film released too late to honor in 2002)

External links
2003 San Francisco Film Critics Circle Awards

References
Critics honor 'Lost in Translation'

San Francisco Film Critics Circle Awards
2003 film awards
2003 in San Francisco